Pterophorus bacteriopa is a moth of the family Pterophoridae. It is known from Tanzania.

References

Endemic fauna of Tanzania
bacteriopa
Insects of Tanzania
Moths of Africa
Moths described in 1922